Hedylopsoidea was defined as a taxonomic superfamily of sea slugs, mostly marine gastropod mollusks within the informal group Opisthobranchia according to the taxonomy of Bouchet & Rocroi (2005).

Schrödl & Neusser (2010) have redefined the taxonomy of Acochlidiacea in 2010.

Families
Families within the superfamily Hedylopsoidea according to the taxonomy of Bouchet & Rocroi (2005) include:
Family Hedylopsidae
Family Ganitidae
Family Livorniellidae
Family Minicheviellidae
Family Parhedylidae
Family Tantulidae

References

Obsolete gastropod taxa